The president of the Regional Government of Galicia, is the head of government of Galicia. The president leads the executive branch of the regional government.

The current office is established under the Galician Statute of Autonomy. It is occupied by Alfonso Rueda.

See also
List of presidents of the Regional Government of Galicia
Politics of Galicia
Xunta de Galicia

References